The Borough of Stockton-on-Tees is a unitary authority with borough status in the counties of County Durham and North Yorkshire, England. The borough had a population of 191,600 in 2011.

The main settlement and namesake of the borough is Stockton-on-Tees, which lies on the north bank of the River Tees with the towns of Billingham and Norton-on-Tees. All three towns are in County Durham. The towns of Ingleby Barwick, Thornaby-on-Tees and Yarm are south of the river in North Yorkshire.

The borough governed by Stockton-on-Tees Borough Council, and the current mayor is Cllr Ross Patterson. The borough is part of Tees Valley with nearby boroughs of Darlington, Middlesbrough, Redcar and Cleveland and Hartlepool.

All River Tees bridges from Yarm Viaduct to Transporter Bridge are in the borough at least on one side, with the Borough of Middlesbrough to the south downstream on the other side to the east of the borough. Teesside International Airport is shared between the borough and the Borough of Darlington.

History

Municipal authority
Stockton previously held borough status as the Municipal Borough of Stockton-on-Tees in historic County Durham.

Loss of status

In 1968, the borough was merged into Teesside County Borough; this civil parish was a part of the ceremonial (not administrative) North Riding county until its abolition.

District authority

The town regained borough status on 1 April 1974 as a result of the Local Government Act 1972. It became a non-metropolitan district of the County of Cleveland, itself established at the same time. Multiple parishes and boroughs merged into Stockton's newly formed district borough:
Teesside County Borough's area covering the former Stockton, Billingham and Thornaby municipal boroughs,
Hilton, Ingleby Barwick, Kirklevington, Maltby, and Yarm parishes of the previous North Riding County-administrated Stokesley Rural District, and
Part of the County Durham-administrated Stockton Rural District parishes.

Unitary authority

The borough became a unitary authority on 1 April 1996. It is ceremonially split between County Durham and North Yorkshire, to the north and south of the Tees respectively. It is the only council in England to be split between two ceremonial counties. The former districts and boroughs of Durham now form the unitary authority of County Durham, so ceremonial County Durham now has four unitary authorities.

Council

The Borough has 26 wards with either one, two or three councillors representing each.
There are 56 councillors in total. Following the 2019 elections, the councillors are divided politically as follows:
24 Labour
14 Conservative
and several smaller groups.

Economy
The Office for National Statistics has published a chart (pp. 240–253) of the trend of regional gross value of Hartlepool and Stockton-on-Tees (figures in Sterling [millions]).

 includes hunting and forestry.

 includes energy and construction.

 includes financial intermediation services indirectly measured.

 Components may not sum to totals due to rounding.

Demographics 
In the 2021 census, the borough was recorded as having a population of 196,595 with 50.9% being female. 

For religion, 51.1% identified themselves as Christian, 39.1% having no religion, 3.4% Muslim, 0.4% Hindu, 0.4% Sikh, 0.3% Buddhist, and 0.3% answering 'Other' as well as 5% not answering. 

For ethnicity, those who identified as White were 92.0%, Asian, Asian British or Asian Welsh were 4.6%, Black, Black British, Black Welsh, Caribbean or African were 1.1%, Mixed or Multiple ethnic groups were 1.4%, and the 'Other' ethnic group category recorded 0.8%.

For sexuality, those who identified as Straight or Heterosexual were 91.6%, Gay or Lesbian were 1.4%, Bisexual was 0.9%, Pansexual was 0.2%, Asexual was 0.0%, Queer was 0.0, 'All other sexual orientations' were 0.0% and those who did not answer were 5.9%. 

[Note, for percentages with 0.0%, this may due to a number too low to represent using the number of digits supplied rather than a lack of those who identified as that specific idea]

Local Nature Reserves 
The council maintains a number of local nature reserves including Barwick Pond, Charlton's Pond, Greenvale, Hardwick Dene and Elm Tree Woods, Norton Grange Marsh, Quarry Wood (Eaglescliffe), and Stillington Forest Park.

References

External links
Statistics about Stockton-on-Tees from the Office for National Statistics Census 2001

 
Unitary authority districts of England
Places in the Tees Valley
Local government in County Durham
Local government districts of North Yorkshire
Local government districts of North East England
Boroughs in England